Kenya Barris (born August 9, 1973) is an American film and television writer, producer, director, and actor. He is best known as the creator of the ABC sitcom black-ish (2014–2022).

Early life 
Barris was born in Inglewood, California, the second of five children. He was named after the country of Kenya, which his father had visited. His parents divorced when he was a child. He is an alumnus of Clark Atlanta University.

Career
Barris has created numerous television shows, including the critically acclaimed Black-ish. The award-winning series also has two spin-offs, Grown-ish and Mixed-ish, and a third potential spin-off Old-ish. He was a writer for The Game, Girlfriends, and Soul Food. Barris co-created and produced America's Next Top Model with Tyra Banks. He penned the film Girls Trip. He co-produced the 2019 film Little and co-wrote the screenplay for the 2019 theatrical release Shaft.

In 2020, Barris made his acting debut in #BlackAF, a series he developed for Netflix, co-starring Rashida Jones and Iman Benson. In October 2020, Barris announced that he would write, produce, and direct a biopic on comedian Richard Pryor for MGM. 

Also in 2020, it was reported his production company, Khalabo Ink Society, was considering a deal with ViacomCBS. His company entered a multi-project development deal with Audible in 2021.

In 2021, it was reported that Barris was developing a potential television series, Brown-ish, with Eva Longoria.

In August 2022, it was announced that Barris would write and direct a modern remake of The Wizard of Oz.

Personal life 
Barris married anesthesiologist Dr. Rania "Rainbow" Edwards Barris in 2000. They have six children. His wife filed for divorce in 2014, and Barris filed for divorce in 2019: the couple reconciled and withdrew their divorce petitions both times. Barris filed for divorce a second time in 2022.

Filmography

Films

Television series

Awards
In 2019, Black-ish won several NAACP Image Awards. It was named best comedy series and Tracee Ellis Ross and Anthony Anderson took acting honors. Black-ish was the winner of the Entertainment and Children's Peabody Award in 2016. Barris and Black-ish also won the 2017 NAACP Image Award for Outstanding Writing in a Comedy Series. Barris was nominated for the same award in 2018. He was also nominated for a Primetime Emmy Award for Outstanding Comedy Series in 2016, 2017, 2018, and 2021, and a PGA Award for Outstanding Producer of Episodic Television, Comedy for Black-ish in 2014. In 2016, Barris won the Rod Serling Award for Advancing Social Justice Through Popular Media.

In 2018, he donated $1 million to Clark Atlanta University, and was granted an honorary doctorate in humane letters.

References

External links 
 

1973 births
American television writers
Television producers from California
Living people
African-American screenwriters
Screenwriters from California
America's Next Top Model
People from Inglewood, California
Clark Atlanta University alumni
Black-ish
Emmy Award winners